Sidian Bank, formerly known as K-Rep Bank, is a commercial bank in Kenya, licensed by the Central Bank of Kenya, the national banking regulator.

Location
The headquarters of Sidian Bank are located at K-Rep Centre, on Wood Avenue, in Kilimani, a neighborhood in Nairobi, the capital and largest city in Kenya. The coordinates of the bank's headquarters are: 01°17'26.0"S, 36°47'10.0"E (Latitude:-1.290556; Longitude:36.786112).

Overview
The bank is a medium-sized financial services provider, serving the urban and rural poor and small-to-medium business enterprises in Kenya.  , the total assets of the bank were valued at KES:27.465 billion (US$259.3 million, with shareholders equity of KES:4.002 billion (US$37.8 million.
The name Sidian is derived from Obsidian, an extrusive igneous rock.

History
Sidian Bank was founded in 1984 as K-Rep Bank. In the beginning, the organization provided grants and technical assistance to non-governmental organizations (NGO). The NGOs then made loans to micro-enterprises. In 1989, K-Rep changed its strategy to lending to the NGOs. The technical assistance that had been provided for free now attracted a fee.

In 1999, K-Rep re-organized itself into four entities:

 K-Rep Group – This is the parent company. It owns, either wholly or partially, the other three subsidiaries.
 K-Rep Development Agency – This agency carries out research and developmental assistance work for the group
 K-Rep Advisory Services – This company provides consultancy services for a fee.
In 2015, Centum Investment Company completed its acquisition of a majority stake in the bank. On 4 April 2016, K-Rep Bank re-branded as Sidian Bank, to reflect the majority shareholding by Centum Investments Limited.

Ownership
As at 31 December 2019, the major shareholders in the bank stock included the following:

1 - Bakii Holdco Limited is a Non-Operating Holding Company and a wholly owned subsidiary of Centum Investments. This is in accordance with the CBK Banking Act and Prudential Guidelines.
2 - K-Rep Group are the entities that founded K-Rep Bank in 1984.

In March 2019, the Investment Fund for Developing Countries (IFU), a Danish, self-governing, state-owned investment fund, lent Sidian Bank KSh:1,200,000,000 (approx. US$11.2 million). During the next 36 months, IFU has the option to convert some or all of the principal into share capital in the bank. If all the principal is converted into capital, the Fund will acquire 20 percent shareholding in the bank and gain two seats on the expanded seven-person bank board. Each of the other shareholders will be diluted proportionately.

Governance
The chairman of the seven-person board of directors is James Mworia, one of the non-executive directors. Chege Thumbi serves as the managing director.

Sale to Access Bank Group
In June 2022, media reports indicated that Centum Investments had signed binding agreements to sale the 83.4 percent that it owned in Sidian Bank to Access Bank Group of Nigeria, for a consideration of KSh4.3 billion (approx. US$37 million). It is expected that after the deal closes, Sidian Bank will be merged with the current Access Bank Kenya, where Access Bank Group maintains 99.98 percent shareholding. The transaction requires regulatory approval in both Kenya and Nigeria.

See also
 List of banks in Kenya
 Economy of Kenya

References

External links
 Website of Sidian Bank
 Sidian Bank staff layoffs pointer to looming turmoil As of 24 October 2016.

 

Banks of Kenya
Companies based in Nairobi
Banks established in 1984
1984 establishments in Kenya